Remedium (Polish remedy) is the third studio album by Polish rapper Tau, released on December 3, 2014 by his own label Bozon Records. It was his first album released after changing his stage name from Medium to Tau. The album features guest appearances by Kali, Bezczel, Buka, Paluch, Zeus, the singer Agnieszka Musiał and rapper Lecrae. At first, rapper stated there was going to be guest appearances by KęKę and Peja, although their contribution was canceled by Tau himself.

Remedium was promoted with four singles: "Logo Land", released on September 24, 2014, "List motywacyjny" with featured appearance by Paluch, which was released on October 28, 2014, "BHO" recorded along with Bezczel and "Remedium", which was shared on Tau's page on October 2, 2014. For all of those tracks there were videos made. In contradistinction to previous Tau's projects, on which he was in charge of the entire production, Remedium was produced by several producers, such as Zdolny, Chris Carson and Gawvi.

The album debuted at number 4 on the Polish OLiS chart, having sold over fifteen thousand copies within several months.

Track listing 

Sample credits
 "Pierwsze tchnienie" contains a sample from "Impeach the President" by The Honey Drippers and "This Masquerade" by George Benson.
 "BHO" contains a sample from "Jesteś tu" by Maria Koterbska.
 "Puk puk" contains a sample from "Zabiorę Cię ze sobą" by Halina Frąckowiak and Grupa ABC Andrzeja Nebeskiego.

Personnel 
All information about the personnel was adopted from Discogs.

Musicians
 Tau - rap, lyrics, producer, executive producer
 Zeus - rap, lyrics
 Kali - rap, lyrics
 Bezczel - rap, lyrics
 Buka - rap, lyrics
 Lecrae - rap, lyrics
 Paluch - rap, lyrics
 Agnieszka Musiał - background vocal
 Kamila Pałasz - background vocal
 Klaudia Duda - soprano
 Chris Carson - producer
 Gawvi - producer
 Zdolny - producer
 Cabatino - bass guitar (tracks: 3, 10)
 Piotr Restecki - acoustic guitar (track: 10)

Technical personnel
 Marek Dulewicz - mixing, mastering
 Jacob "Biz" Morris - mixing (track: 9)
 Wojciech Niebelski - sound engineer
 Karolina Wilczyńska - photography
 SewerX - artwork
 Published by Bozon Records
 Distributed by Step Records
 Recording
 Recorded at United Records in Kielce

References 

2014 albums
Polish-language albums
Tau albums
Albums produced by Tau
Bozon Records albums